Scalp Trouble is a 1939 Warner Bros. Looney Tunes cartoon directed by Bob Clampett. The cartoon was released on June 24, 1939, and stars Porky Pig and Daffy Duck.

The cartoon has been criticized for its stereotypical and insensitive depictions of Native Americans.

Plot

General Daffy is commanding Army Post No. 13 on the frontier, and his troops are a sorry lot.  Soldier Porky refuses to get out of his bed—that is, until Daffy comes in and eventually destroys it. Soon a tribe of Indians launches an attack on the post on horseback. Porky sees them approaching, and attempts to awaken the other sleeping soldiers.  Among the subsequent gags are:  An Indian drinks "fire water" and spits fire, carving an Indian-shaped hole in the front of the fort, then walks through it; a short Indian uses the bow-leg of a taller Indian to shoot arrows; and a soldier shoots over the wall at the enemy, keeping score to the tune of "Ten Little Indians." Porky abandons the cannon for pistols, and soon calls for more bullets.  Daffy, loaded down with ammunition and running toward Porky, stumbles, resulting in Daffy swallowing a large quantity of bullets, and begins firing them off through his mouth, uncontrollably.  Taking the situation in hand, Porky uses Daffy as a machine gun, finally driving off the Indian invaders, who carve into a hillside, "Yanks Beat Indians 11-3" as they retreat. The battle now concluded, Daffy is relieved, saying, "I'm sure that's glad that's over with."  However, Daffy stumbles once again as he walks away, and again begins spitting out bullets uncontrollably, as the cartoon irises out.

Slightly Daffy

Friz Freleng remade the cartoon in Technicolor and was released in June 17, 1944, under the name Slightly Daffy. Unlike the remakes directed by Clampett, the short is mostly a frame-by-frame remake. However, it features new voice recordings, a few new animated scenes, and re-orchestrated music. The Blue Ribbon reissue is approximately 49 seconds shorter than the original cartoon.

The short also reused scenes from other old cartoons, such as Johnny Smith and Poker-Huntas (By Tex Avery) for the first few scenes of the Indians, and The Hardship of Miles Standish (Also by Freleng) for the scene of the Indians firing their bows.

References

External links

Slightly Daffy at IMDb

Looney Tunes shorts
Warner Bros. Cartoons animated short films
1939 films
1939 animated films
Daffy Duck films
Porky Pig films
American black-and-white films
Films scored by Carl Stalling
Films directed by Bob Clampett
Films produced by Leon Schlesinger
1930s Warner Bros. animated short films